The 2008 Hopman Cup (also known as the Hyundai Hopman Cup for sponsorship reasons) corresponds to the 20th edition of the Hopman Cup tournament between nations in men's and women's tennis. Eight teams participated in the World Group with one qualifier from the Asian region, Chinese Taipei.

The first matches were held on 29 December 2007, and the final took place on 4 January 2008 at the Burswood Entertainment Complex, Perth, Western Ausrralia.

For the first time in History, Serena Williams and Novak Djokovic faced each other in a competitive event. Williams emerged victorious in the mixed doubles rubber alongside Mardy Fish.

Teams and seedings

 – Serena Williams1 (6) and Mardy Fish (39) (champions)
 – Jelena Janković (3) and Novak Djokovic (3) (finalists)
 – Lucie Šafářová (23) and Tomáš Berdych (14)
 – Tatiana Golovin (13) and Arnaud Clément (54)
 – Gisela Dulko (37) and Juan Ignacio Chela (20)
 – Alicia Molik (56) and Peter Luczak (79) 
 – Sania Mirza (31) and Rohan Bopanna (267)
 – Hsieh Su-wei (157) and Lu Yen-hsun (110)

1Due to illness Serena Williams was unable to play the USA's opening tie against India. She was replaced by Meghann Shaughnessy.

Group A

Standings

Serbia vs. Chinese Taipei

France vs. Argentina

Serbia vs. France

Argentina vs. Chinese Taipei

Serbia vs. Argentina

France vs. Chinese Taipei

Group B

Standings

United States vs. India

Czech Republic vs. Australia

United States vs. Czech Republic

Australia vs. India

United States vs. Australia

Czech Republic vs. India

Final

Serbia vs. United States

External links

Hopman Cup
Hopman Cup
2008
January 2008 sports events in Australia
December 2007 sports events in Australia
December 2007 sports events in the United States